The 14th Army Corps, is a tactical formation of the Russian Navy formed in 2017 as part of the Northern Fleet. It is the tactical command of the Northern Fleet's coastal defence troops.

The corps is located in Murmansk Oblast, with its headquarters in the city of Murmansk.

Formation
The corps was formed in April 2017, and is assigned to perform tasks in the Arctic. The corps consists of two Arctic motorized rifle brigades, whose personnel are trained in ski warfare, the use of reindeer and dog sleds, and the construction of igloos. The corps' service members deploy as part of the coastal troops of the Northern Military District. They take part in competitions of the Army-2020 exhibitions and carry out winter training at the battalion and divisional tactical levels with live-fire exercises.

Parts of the corps, notably its 200th Separate Motor Rifle Brigade and 80th Arctic Motor Rifle Brigade, took part in the 2022 Russian invasion of Ukraine.

Composition

Headquarters staff (Murmansk)
80th Arctic Motor Rifle Brigade (Alakurtti)
200th Motor Rifle Brigade (Pechenga)
58th Control Battalion (Murmansk)

Commanders
 Lieutenant-General  (2017 - 2022)
 Major General Boris Fomichev (2022 - present)

References 

 https://www.iltalehti.fi/ulkomaat/a/4925bbc2-917e-4732-8c1b-6d16edfa15cc - losses in Ukraine
 https://www.etterretningstjenesten.no/publikasjoner/fokus/innhold/Russland - losses in Ukraine
 
Military units and formations established in 2017
2017 establishments in Russia
Army corps of the Russian Federation
Military in the Arctic